Gennady Ivanovich Andropov (1 August 1939 – 21 March 2016) was a Ukrainian swimmer. He won a gold medal in the individual 400 m medley at the 1962 European Aquatics Championships, and set a world record in the same event in 1957. In the 1500 m freestyle discipline, he won a bronze medal at the 1958 European Aquatics Championships and competed at the 1956 and 1960 Summer Olympics. He was a national champion in the 400 m (1961), 1500 m (1956, 1960) and 4×200 m freestyle (1961) and 400 m medley (1962, 1963) events.

References

1939 births
2016 deaths
Sportspeople from Novosibirsk
Sportspeople from Lviv
Soviet male freestyle swimmers
Soviet male medley swimmers
Ukrainian male freestyle swimmers
Ukrainian male medley swimmers
Olympic swimmers of the Soviet Union
Swimmers at the 1956 Summer Olympics
Swimmers at the 1960 Summer Olympics
European Aquatics Championships medalists in swimming